Aphomoeoma is a monotypic moth genus in the subfamily Lymantriinae. Its only species, Aphomoeoma mesembrinum, is found on Madagascar. Both the genus and the species were first described by Cyril Leslie Collenette in 1959.

References

Lymantriinae
Monotypic moth genera